Marlborough Royal Free Grammar School, previously known as Marlborough Grammar School and King Edward's School, Marlborough, was a grammar school in the town of Marlborough, in Wiltshire, England, founded in 1550.

Originally for boys only, the school became co-educational in 1906. Over a period of more than four hundred years, it had a number of homes around Marlborough. In 1975 it was closed, and its final buildings were re-used for the new St John's Marlborough comprehensive school.

History
The Abolition of Chantries Act of 1547 closed all of the Kingdom of England's chantries, including the Hospital of St John, Marlborough. The town's burgesses then petitioned the Crown for the hospital to be converted into a "'Free-scole for the inducement of youth", and by letters patent dated 18 October 1550 a grammar school was established. The former hospital thus became the school's first home, but in 1578 it was demolished and a new building was erected which provided a schoolroom, a house for the schoolmaster, and dormitories. This survived until 1790.

The school was sometimes known as King Edward's School, Marlborough, in memory of King Edward VI, but in the course of the 18th century it began to be known as Marlborough Grammar School.

In 1834 a Charity Commissioners' report called the school the "Free Grammar School" and found that its original purpose was to teach Greek, Latin, and the church catechism, and that the governing body was the Corporation of Marlborough. Fourteen boys were then being taught the prescribed subjects without the payment of fees, but had to pay for other subjects. There were also twenty-six "pay-scholars", including some boarders.

In 1853 the school survived a proposal by Earl Bruce to amalgamate it with the new Marlborough College. During the nineteenth century it declined.

In 1872, the school had endowments worth £248 a year, and there were five schoolmasters teaching 85 boys. Some 37 of those were "sons of persons resident three years in town" and so were on the foundation, paying fees of six guineas a year, while the rest were boarders paying between 45 and 50 Guineas. The school was entitled to Exhibitions at Brasenose College, Oxford, two worth £52 a year and four worth £36, and to a smaller number at St John's College, Cambridge.

In 1899 the school was closed, but in 1906 it reopened in new buildings, known as Marlborough Grammar School , now taking the form of a mixed school for eighty boys and girls. In 1947 a boarding-house for both sexes was established at Wye House.

Having already occupied a variety of different sites in Marlborough, in 1962 the school again moved into new buildings, this time on the edge of the town centre.

In 1975, the school and the local secondary modern school, Marlborough Secondary Modern, were both closed, and a new comprehensive school, now called St John's Marlborough, was created and took over the buildings of both former schools. New school buildings were later built alongside those of the old grammar school, and the old buildings were demolished in 2010.

Headmasters
Dr John Hildrop, 1711
Rev. William Stone, 1733–1750
Rev. Thomas Neyler the Elder, 1750–1774
Rev. Joseph Edwards, 1774–1808
Rev. J. T. Lawes, 1809–1828
Rev. T. Nayler, 1828
Rev. Frederick Hookey Bond, 1853–1877
 Sidney Pontefract , 1905-1932
 Arthur Redvers Stedman , 1932-1962 
 Michael Stevens ,  Acting Headmaster, 1963

Notable former pupils
 Robin Baker, biologist and writer, author of Sperm Wars, attended 1955–1962
 Frederick Bligh Bond (1864–1945), architect
 Edward Caswall (1814–1878), clergyman, poet, and hymn writer
 Charles Chenery (1850–1928), international footballer
 Michael Dodson (1732–1799), lawyer and writer on religious subjects
 Sir William Golding novelist, Nobel Laureate in Literature
 Phil Hammond (born 1962), comedian
 Phil Harding (born 1950), archaeologist, known for Channel 4's Time Team
 Walter Harte (1709–1774), poet and historian
 Frederick Maddison (1849–1907), previously known as Frederick Patey Chappell, footballer who played for England in the first international football match
Henry Moule (1801–1880), clergyman and inventor of the dry earth closet
 John Whitelocke (1757–1833), British Army general
 Simon Barter (1924–2015), public sector audit specialist

Further reading
Alfred Redvers Stedman, A History of Marlborough grammar school 1550-1945 (Devizes, 1945)

See also
 List of English and Welsh endowed schools (19th century)

References

Boys' schools in Wiltshire
Defunct grammar schools in England
Defunct schools in Wiltshire
Educational institutions established in the 1550s
1550 establishments in England
1975 disestablishments in England
Educational institutions disestablished in 1975
Marlborough, Wiltshire